The Niger-class frigates were 32-gun sailing frigates of the fifth rate produced for the Royal Navy. They were designed in 1757 by Sir Thomas Slade, and were an improvement on his 1756 design for the 32-gun s. 

Slade's design was approved in September 1757, on which date four ships were approved to be built to these plans - three by contract and a fourth in a royal dockyard. Seven more ships were ordered to the same design between 1759 and 1762 - three more to be built by contract and four in royal dockyards. Stag and Quebec were both reduced to 28-gun sixth rates in 1778, but were then restored to 32-gun fifth rates in 1779.

Ships in class 
 
 Ordered: 19 September 1757
 Built by:  Thomas Stanton & Company, Rotherhithe.
 Keel laid:  26 September 1757
 Launched:  4 September 1758
 Completed:  4 December 1758 at Deptford Dockyard.
 Fate:  Taken to pieces at Deptford Dockyard in July 1783.
 
 Ordered: 19 September 1757
 Built by:  John Barnard & John Turner, Harwich.
 Keel laid:  26 September 1757
 Launched:  19 September 1758
 Completed:  24 June 1759 at the builder's shipyard.
 Fate:  Taken to pieces at Portsmouth Dockyard in September 1812.
 
 Ordered: 19 September 1757
 Built by:  Thomas West, Deptford.
 Keel laid:  September 1757
 Launched:  29 November 1758
 Completed:  18 January 1759 at Deptford Dockyard.
 Fate:  Renamed Guernsey on 7 May 1800. Taken to pieces at Sheerness Dockyard in April 1801.
 
 Ordered: 19 September 1757
 Built by: Sheerness Dockyard.
 Keel laid:  7 February 1758
 Launched:  25 September 1759
 Completed:  24 November 1759.
 Fate:  Renamed Negro 1813. Sold at Portsmouth Dockyard on 29 September 1814.
 
 Ordered: 6 June 1759
 Built by: Sheerness Dockyard.
 Keel laid:  26 April 1760
 Launched:  15 September 1761
 Completed:  10 October 1761.
 Fate:  Captured by French squadron off Gibraltar on 1 May 1779.
 
 Ordered: 16 July 1759
 Built by:  John Barnard & John Turner, Harwich.
 Keel laid:  July 1759
 Launched:  14 July 1760
 Completed:  9 August 1760 at the builder's shipyard.
 Fate:  Blew up and sunk in action against French frigate La Surveillante off Ushant on 6 October 1779.
 
 Ordered: 24 March 1761
 Built by: Chatham Dockyard.
 Keel laid:  6 May 1761
 Launched:  27 March 1762
 Completed:  14 May 1762.
 Fate:  Renamed Prothee 19 March 1825. Sold at Portsmouth Dockyard on 14 January 1832.
 
 Ordered: 24 March 1761
 Built by: Hugh Blaydes, Hull.
 Keel laid:  13 May 1761
 Launched:  8 June 1762
 Completed:  October 1762 at the builder's shipyard.
 Fate:  Taken to pieces at Deptford Dockyard in October 1793.
 
 Ordered: 11 August 1761
 Built by: Sheerness Dockyard.
 Keel laid:  29 March 1762
 Launched:  31 May 1764
 Completed:  26 June 1766.
 Fate:  Sold at Sheerness Dockyard on 3 November 1813.
 
 Ordered: 30 January 1762
 Built by: Hugh Blaydes & Thomas Hodgson, Hull.
 Keel laid:  March 1762
 Launched:  24 October 1763
 Completed:  December 1763 at the builder's shipyard.
 Fate:  Taken to pieces at Woolwich Dockyard in January 1786.
 
 Ordered: 8 December 1762
 Built by: Chatham Dockyard.
 Keel laid:  10 October 1763
 Launched:  13 January 1766
 Completed:  24 July 1769.
 Fate:  Lost with all hands in the Indian Ocean (disappeared, fate unknown) in January 1770.

References 

 Robert Gardiner, The First Frigates, Conway Maritime Press, London 1992. .
 David Lyon, The Sailing Navy List, Conway Maritime Press, London 1993. .
 Rif Winfield, British Warships in the Age of Sail, 1714 to 1792, Seaforth Publishing, London 2007. .

Frigate classes
Frigates of the United Kingdom
Ship classes of the Royal Navy